This is a list of the players who were on the rosters of the given teams that participated in the 2012 Summer Paralympics for wheelchair rugby.

Teams















Source: Paralympic.org

References

Rosters